The Dodge Fast Four is a model made by Dodge from 1927 until 1928. It came in three types, series 124, 128 and 129.

In 1927, the Dodge Fast Four was the new mid-level car from Dodge. The Fast Four looked similar to earlier 4-cylinder Dodges, but the body was more rounded. Standard equipment included a speedometer, an ammeter, a tool kit, and a headlight dimmer. Optional items included things like a rear bumper, a Motometer, a heater, and windshield wipers. The only real difference between the 128 and the 129 was that the 128 had 19-inch wheels, while the 129 had 21-inch wheels.

References 

Fast Four
Cars introduced in 1927
1920s cars